The 2015–16 Georgie Pie Super Smash (named after the competition's sponsor McDonald's New Zealand brand Georgie Pie) was the eleventh season of the Men's Super Smash Twenty20 cricket tournament in New Zealand. The tournament consisted of a double round-robin, with the top three teams qualifying for the play-offs.

The Auckland Aces won the tournament.

Teams

Table

Win = 4 points /
No Result = 2 points /
Q = Qualified

Expansion Bids:
Tauranga,
Palmerston North,
Nelson

Grounds

2015 matches

See also 

 Plunket Shield
 Ford Trophy
 HRV Cup

References 

New Zealand domestic cricket competitions
Super Smash (cricket)